Pawan Kumar Bansal (born 16 July 1948) is an Indian National Congress politician, appointed interim treasurer in November 2020 and a former minister in the Manmohan Singh government. He represented Chandigarh constituency in the 15th Lok Sabha (2009-2014) of India. He served as Minister of Railways from 28 October 2012 to 10 May 2013.

Early life
Bansal was born on 16 July 1948 in Sunam. His family hailed from Tapa, Punjab. He went to school at the Yadavindra Public School, Patiala, and did BSc from the Post Graduate Government College, Sector 11, Chandigarh. He also holds an LLB degree from the Department of Law, Panjab University, Chandigarh.

Career
Bansal has represented Chandigarh as a member of Parliament in the 10th, 13th, 14th and 15th Lok Sabha. He has worked as the Minister of Parliamentary Affairs and the Minister of Water Resources in the Second Manmohan Singh ministry. He also held the charge of the Minister of State for Finance and Parliamentary Affairs in the First Manmohan Singh Cabinet.

Railway Minister
He took over as the Railway Minister, becoming the first from his party since 1996. Soon after becoming Railways minister, he approved an increase in fares, which had been unchanged for the last 15 years, to allow the Indian Railways to be profitable. He contested the 2014 Lok Sabha Elections from Chandigarh.

Railway Budget 2013
The 2013 Railway Budget focused on improving the condition of Indian Railways. Pawan Bansal came up with first ever rail link to connect Arunachal Pradesh. Internet ticketing from 0030 hours to 2330 hours as well as E-ticketing through mobile phones was made available. Four companies of women RPF personnel set up and another 8 to be set up to strengthen the security of rail passengers, especially women passengers. Railways has identified 104 stations for upgradation in cities with more than one million population and of religious significance. This means, these stations the Railways will give attention to all aspects related to cleanliness, according to the Budget highlights the government released. 179 escalators and 400 lifts at A-1 and other major stations to be installed facilitating elderly and differently-able.

Personal life
He is married to Madhu Bansal. They have two sons.

Incident of corruption charges

On 3 May 2013, the CBI arrested his nephew, Vijay Singla, after they caught an aide counting two bags of cash. After the scam came to light in May, the CBI interrogated Pawan Kumar Bansal, Congress MP from Chandigarh, for ten hours, but failed to find substantial evidence to nail him. In his statement, Bansal denied having any knowledge of his nephew's activities.

CBI does not have any tapped conversation which shows that former Railway Minister Pawan Kumar Bansal was involved in or had any knowledge of the Rs 10 crore cash for post bribery scandal, which prompted the agency not to make him an accused in the case, sources said here today.

The CBI said that Mr Bansal will serve as prosecution witness. The judge has responded. "If the CBI has chosen to make Mr Bansal a witness, then at this juncture, there being no evidence against him, the court cannot pass any order or question him, except during the trial."

References

External links

Category:Railway Ministers of India

1948 births
Living people
Indian National Congress politicians
People from Sangrur district
People from Sangrur
India MPs 2004–2009
Union ministers of state of India
Members of the Cabinet of India
India MPs 1991–1996
India MPs 1999–2004
India MPs 2009–2014
Lok Sabha members from Chandigarh
United Progressive Alliance candidates in the 2014 Indian general election